"You're My First Lady" is a song written by Mac McAnally, and recorded by American country music artist T. G. Sheppard.  It was released in March 1987 as the third single from the album It Still Rains in Memphis.  The song reached #2 on the Billboard Hot Country Singles & Tracks chart.

Chart performance

References

1987 singles
T. G. Sheppard songs
Songs written by Mac McAnally
Columbia Records singles
1987 songs